Rootes may refer to:

People 
Baron Rootes, a peerage in the United Kingdom
Jamey Rootes (1966-2022), American sports executive
Maurice Rootes (1917–1997), British film editor
William Rootes, 1st Baron Rootes (1894–1964), founder of the Rootes Group
William Geoffrey Rootes (1917–1992), 2nd Baron Rootes

Companies 
 Rootes Group, British car and commercial vehicle manufacturer founded by William Edward Rootes
 Rootes Arrow, a badge engineered range of cars produced by the Rootes Group
 Rootes Australia, Australian assembler of Rootes Group vehicles
 Rootes Aircraft Factory, located at RAF Speke during the Second World War

See also 
 Root (disambiguation)